Star Castle is a fortress on St Mary's, Isles of Scilly, built in 1593 by Robert Adams, Surveyor of the Royal Works (d.1595) and Francis Godolphin, Captain of the Scilly Isles, during the "Spanish invasion scare."

Description
The Star Castle is in the shape of an eight-pointed star and features on the flag of the Council of the Isles of Scilly. It is at the centre of a fortification system around the west side of St Mary’s known as the Garrison. The walls of the castle take the shape of an eight-pointed star. It comprises an outer wall around the outcrop of Hew Hill, protecting the town and the castle, with strategically placed gun batteries at regular intervals around the outer wall, allowing covering fire at all angles.

History

The Star Castle was built in 1593 by the Surveyor of the Royal Works and mapmaker Robert Adams, under the direction of Francis Godolphin, Captain of the Scilly Isles, following the Spanish Armada of 1588. Fearing another Spanish invasion, in May 1593 Queen Elizabeth I ordered the construction of a fort and two sconces as a lookout for any intruder ships.

In 1740 Master Gunner Abraham Tovey transformed the Garrison building walls with gun batteries, including Colonel Boscawen's Battery, in a circular shape following the coast line of The Hoe. In the 18th century it was garrisoned by troops from the Corps of Invalids.

Star Castle was one of six English castles identified by English Heritage in September 2022 as being at risk of destruction due to coastal erosion worsened by global warming. In addition to rising sea levels and more frequent storms, the shape of the garrison walls of Star Castle themselves inadvertenly exacerbate the strength of tidal wavesby creating 'pinch points'and worsen tidal erosion. In response, English Heritage launched a fundraising campaign to protect and strengthen Star Castle (and the five other at-risk sites).

Present usage
Star Castle is now a 4-star hotel. American mystery writer Aaron Elkins set his 2006 novel Unnatural Selection in and around the Castle.

References

External links 

 Official Star Castle Hotel Website

Infrastructure completed in 1595
Buildings and structures in the Isles of Scilly
Forts in Cornwall
Star forts
1593 establishments in England
St Mary's, Isles of Scilly